B'alam, Balam, Balaam, B'ahlam, Bahlam, Bahlum or Bolom may refer to:

In Maya history and culture

 A Maya language name for "jaguar"; see Jaguars in Mesoamerican cultures

Maya rulers
 Itzamnaaj B'alam (r. ca. 697), ruler of Dos Pilas (a.k.a. "Shield Jaguar")
 Itzamnaaj B'alam I (r. ca. 4thC ?), ruler of Yaxchilan (a.k.a. "Shield Jaguar I")
 Itzamnaaj B'alam II (r. 647–742), ruler of Yaxchilan (a.k.a. "Shield Jaguar II (the Great)")
 Itzamnaaj B'alam III (r. 769—800?), ruler of Yaxchilan (a.k.a. "Shield Jaguar III")
 Kan B'alam I (r. 572—583), ruler of Palenque
 Kaloomte' B'alam (r. ca. 511—527), 19th dynastic ruler of Tikal (a.k.a. "Curl Head")
 Kayb'il B'alam (r. early 16thC), Postclassic ruler of the Mam Maya people of the northern Guatemalan highland region at the time of the Spanish conquest
 K'inich Kan B'alam II (r. 683—702), ruler of Palenque, son of K'inich Janaab' Pakal ("Pacal the Great")
 K'inich K'uk B'alam II (fl. c. 765), ruler of Palenque
 K'uk' B'alam I (r. 431—435), ruler of Palenque and founder of the state's dynastic line
 Yopaat B'alam I (r. 359—?), ruler of Yaxchilan, founder of the state's dynastic line
 Yopaat B'alam II (r. ca. 749), ruler of Yaxchilan

Maya polities and archaeological sites
 B'alam (Maya polity), a Classic-era Maya state, known from inscriptions but whose location is not determined
 Balamdzay, archaeological site in the Puuc region
 Balamku, archaeological site in central Yucatán Peninsula
 Balamtun, archaeological site in the Petén Basin region

Other uses in Maya culture
 Na Bolom, a non-profit foundation for the advancement of the indigenous Maya peoples of Chiapas, Mexico

Arts and media
 Balam (magazine), a magazine of Latin American photography based in Buenos Aires, Argentina
 Balam (1949 film), a 1949 Hindi film
 Balam (1969 film), a 1969 South Korean film
 Balam (2009 film), a 2009 Tamil romantic drama film
 Balamory, a British children's show

Other people
Balam (singer), Bangladeshi singer and composer
 Balaam, a prophet in the Torah
 David D. Balam, Canadian astronomer
 Richard Balam, mathematician

Other uses
 Asteroid 3749 Balam
 Balam, Iran, a village in Khuzestan Province, Iran
 Balam (demon), in Judeo-Christian tradition